Fastball is an American rock band that formed in Austin, Texas, in 1992. The band originally called themselves Magneto U.S.A. but changed their name after signing with Hollywood Records.

In 1998, their album All the Pain Money Can Buy reached platinum sales within six months of its release, and stayed on the Billboard 200 chart for a year. Their songs "The Way" and "Out of My Head" reached #1 and #14 on Billboards Adult Alternative Songs chart. In addition, the group has been nominated for two Grammy Awards – Best Rock Performance by a Duo or Group with Vocal for "The Way", and Best Long Form Music Video for their promotional video "The Way". They also received five The Austin Chronicle awards: 1998's Album of the Year, Best Video, Best Single/EP, Band of the Year, and 1995's Best Pop Band.

In late 2021, Fastball started a Patreon campaign where they release new music, as well as demos of their songs and the stories behind them.

 History 

 Formation 
In 1992, Tony Scalzo, Miles Zuniga, and Joey Shuffield formed Fastball in Austin, Texas. Zuniga and Shuffield first played together in a band called Big Car. After a stint with another group called Wild Seeds, Shuffield introduced Zuniga to Scalzo, who had played in a band called the Goods in Orange County, California. The trio decided to form their own band, and began playing around the Austin area.

When they first started out, the band tried out several names, such as Star 69, Magneto, Magneto USA, Ed Clark's Business Bible, and Starchy, before finally deciding to adopt the name Fastball in 1995.

 Make Your Mama Proud 
Fastball quickly built a strong following in the Austin area, and created a regional buzz. As a result, a local journalist spotted them, and suggested that Hollywood Records check them out. They did, and Fastball soon signed a recording contract. Scalzo and Zuniga took turns singing and writing the songs, while Shuffield backed them up on drums. In 1996, Make Your Mama Proud arrived in stores. The album didn't sell very well, but it did win the "Best Pop Band" category at the Austin Music Awards (they tied with another local Austin band, The Wannabes). The following year, the members of Fastball were unsure of their future.

 All the Pain Money Can Buy 
The members of Fastball still had side jobs as late as January 1998. Tony Scalzo worked the graveyard shift at The Bagel Manufactory in Austin. He, Shuffield, and Zuniga would be on The Tonight Show with Jay Leno and Late Night with Conan O'Brien just four months later. Fastball's second album, All the Pain Money Can Buy, was released on Hollywood Records. Within just six months, it had sold more than a million copies.

The single "The Way" stayed on top of Billboard's Modern Rock Tracks chart for seven weeks, and was a top-five hit on Billboard's Top 40 Mainstream chart. Scalzo was inspired to write the song in 1997 after reading a news article about Lela and Raymond Howard, an elderly couple who had disappeared in Texas. Though Lela had Alzheimer's and Raymond was recovering from brain surgery, the couple had been driving to a local festival.  They were discovered two weeks later, dead, at the bottom of a ravine near Hot Springs, Arkansas, hundreds of miles off their intended route.   Scalzo chose to imagine that they began reminiscing and decided to become ethereal beings on a permanent romantic trip, the answer to the song's question, "Where were they going without ever knowing the way?"

Fastball followed up "The Way" with a second single, "Fire Escape", and a third single, "Out of My Head", which reached the top ten on Billboard's Top 40 chart and was a top ten hit on the Adult Top 40 chart for 29 weeks. The album's promotional tour featured Marcy Playground and Everclear, after which Fastball moved to the H.O.R.D.E. tour.

In 1999, Fastball received two Grammy Award nominations as a result of All the Pain Money Can Buy. One was for Best Rock Performance by a Duo or Group with Vocals, and the other was Best Long Form Video for "The Way". They also received an MTV Award nomination for Best New Artist.

 The Harsh Light of Day 
The group headed back into the studio to record their third album, The Harsh Light of Day. Produced by Julian Raymond and Fastball, the album was released in September 2000.

The release included "You're an Ocean", which featured the piano stylings of Billy Preston (who previously collaborated with The Beatles).  Singer-guitarist Brian Setzer also contributed to the album with Latin guitar on "Love Is Expensive and Free." "Instead of tailoring the music for short attention spans, we tried to make an album that holds up well to extensive listening... kind of cinematic, where you notice new themes entering the frame each time you see the film," Zuniga said in the band's record company bio.

Although The Harsh Light of Day sold fewer than 85,000 copies (compared to All The Pain Money Can Buy's 1,000,000+), the trio didn't lose steam and chalked it up to lacking a musical category to fit into. "You can't write down what we do in a sentence” Zuniga told Mac Randall at Launch.com. "Marketing us is a problem. But in a way, that's our saving grace also, because you can't find an easy angle to summarize us and exploit us. We might sell more records if you could, but at the same time, it forces people that really want to be interested in us to pay a little more attention to what we're doing."

In October 2000, Fastball began touring in support of The Harsh Light of Day in Amsterdam. Despite the slowed success, the members of the group didn't regret any of their creative decisions, and their aim remained true. "It makes me feel proud that we're one of these song-oriented guitar bands" Scalzo told Richard Skanse in Rolling Stone. ”I think there's a couple of bands that are still putting out real good quality guitar rock songs, and I think we're one of them."

 Keep Your Wig On 

In June 2004, Fastball released their fourth album, Keep Your Wig On, on a new record label, Rykodisc. Keep Your Wig On was home to singles "Airstream", "Drifting Away", and "Lou-ee, Lou-ee", with the last being released as a single in Europe only.

In 2007, "The Way" was voted No.94 on VH1's television special, The 100 Greatest Songs of the 90’s.

 Little White Lies and solo projects
On April 14, 2009, Fastball released its fifth album, Little White Lies. The album was co-produced by Zuniga and experienced producer CJ Eiriksson, with mixing by Bob Clearmountain.

Scalzo and Zuniga would work on separate solo projects in the following years, with Zuniga's solo album, These Ghosts Have Bones, being released in September 2011 and Scalzo releasing My Favorite Year in February 2013. Both were successfully funded with the help of their respective Kickstarter campaigns.

In April 2013, a new single titled "Love Comes in Waves" was released to digital outlets. The video premiered on YouTube on July 23, 2013.

 Step Into Light 
On February 5, 2015, the band began recording a new album at The Bubble recording studio in Austin. In March, the band announced that "Love Comes in Waves" would be featured on the band's forthcoming album Step Into Light, which was released on May 19. A video for a second song from the album, "I Will Never Let You Down", was released in early March 2017.

In mid-September 2017, the band played a living room concert at the home of Los Angeles–based comic Chet Wild following a nearly year-long Twitter campaign (#FastballAtChets). The concert raised $12,500 via Indiegogo to assist with Hurricane Harvey relief efforts. Several attendees at the concert took part in the filming of the video for "Best Friend" earlier that day, directed by Nigel Dick.

 The Help Machine 
In 2018 and 2019, the band debuted new songs "The Girl You Pretended to Be", "Help Machine" and "All Gone Fuzzy," from The Help Machine, their seventh album, which was released on October 18, 2019.

 The Deep End 
Fastball digitally released their eighth album, The Deep End, on June 17, 2022.

 Members 

 Tony Scalzo – vocals, bass, keyboards, guitar (1995–present)
 Joey Shuffield – drums, percussion (1995–present)
 Miles Zuniga – vocals, guitar (1995–present)Current touring personnel Bobby Daniel – bassFormer touring personnel'''
 Harmoni Kelley – bass, vocals (2006–2008)
 John Clayton – bass, vocals (2008)
 Cory Glaeser – bass, vocals (2009–2011)
 Bruce Hughes – bass, vocals (2008, 2010)
 Michael Klooster – keyboards (2013)
 Robin Wilson – vocals, percussion (2013)
 Lonnie Trevino Jr. – bass, vocals 
 Kevin McKinney – guitar

 Discography 

Studio albums
 Make Your Mama Proud (1996)
 All the Pain Money Can Buy (1998)
 The Harsh Light of Day (2000)
 Keep Your Wig On (2004)
 Little White Lies (2009)
 Step Into Light (2017)
 The Help Machine (2019)
 The Deep End (2022)

EPs
 Soundtrack'' (2022)

See also 
 Music of Austin

References

External links 
 
 Fastball collection at the Internet Archive's live music archive
 Rock Solid Podcast interview

Musical groups from Austin, Texas
Rock music groups from Texas
Musical groups established in 1994
Hollywood Records artists
American power pop groups
1994 establishments in Texas
Rykodisc artists